Papers, Please is a puzzle simulation video game created by indie game developer Lucas Pope, developed and published through his production company, 3909 LLC. The game was released on August 8, 2013 for Microsoft Windows and OS X, for Linux on February 12, 2014 and for iOS on December 12, 2014. A port for the PlayStation Vita was announced in August 2014, and was then released on December 12, 2017. A new port for iOS as well as for Android was released in August 2022.

In Papers, Please, the player takes on the role of a border-crossing immigration officer in the fictional dystopian Eastern Bloc-like country of Arstotzka, which has been and continues to be at political hostilities with its neighboring countries. The game takes place at a migration checkpoint. As the immigration officer, the player must review each immigrant and return citizens' passports and other supporting paperwork against an ever-growing list of rules using a number of tools and guides. Tasks include allowing in those with the proper paperwork while rejecting those without all proper documents,  detaining those with falsified information, and balancing personal finances.

Papers, Please was positively received on its release, and it has come to be seen as an example of an empathy game and a demonstration of video games as an art form. The game was recognized as one of the greatest video games ever made along with various awards and nominations from the Independent Games Festival, Game Developers Choice Awards, and BAFTA Video Games Awards, and was named by Wired and The New Yorker as one of the top games of 2013. Pope reported that by 2016, more than 1.8 million copies of the title had been sold.

Gameplay 
The gameplay of Papers, Please focuses on the work life of an immigration inspector at a border checkpoint for the fictional country of Arstotzka in the year 1982. At the time frame of the game, Arstotzka has recently ended a six-year-long war with the neighboring country of Kolechia, yet political tensions between them and other nearby countries remain high.

As a checkpoint inspector, the player reviews arrivals' documents and uses an array of tools to determine whether the papers are in order for the purpose of arresting certain individuals such as terrorists, wanted criminals, smugglers and entrants with forged or stolen documents; keeping other undesired individuals like those missing required paperwork or expired paperwork out of the country; and allowing the rest through. For each in-game day, the player is given specific rules on what documentation is required and conditions to allow or deny entry which become progressively more complex as each day passes. One by one, immigrants arrive at the checkpoint and provide their paperwork. The player can use a number of tools to review the paperwork to make sure it is in order. When discrepancies are discovered, the player may interrogate the applicant, demand missing documents, take the applicant's fingerprints while simultaneously ordering a copy of the applicant's identity record in order to prove or clear either name or physical description discrepancies, order a full body scan in order to clear or prove weight or apparent biological sex discrepancies or find enough incriminating evidence required to arrest the entrant. There are opportunities for the player to have the applicant detained and the applicant may, at times, attempt to bribe the inspector. The player ultimately must stamp the entrant's passport to accept or deny entry unless the player orders the arrest of the entrant. If the player has violated the protocol, a citation will be issued to the player shortly after the entrant leaves. Generally the player can make two violations without penalty, but subsequent violations will cost the player increasing monetary penalties from their day's salaries. The player has a limited amount of real time, representing a full day shift at the checkpoint, to process as many arrivals as possible.

At the end of each in-game day, the player earns money based on how many people have been processed and bribes collected, lowered by penalties for protocol violations, and then must decide on a simple budget to spend that money on rent, food, heat and other necessities in low-class housing for themselves and their family. The player must also make certain not to earn too much money in illegitimate ways, lest his family be reported and have all the money they had accumulated thus far confiscated by the government. As relations between Arstotzka and nearby countries deteriorate, sometimes due to terrorist attacks, new sets of rules are gradually added, based on the game's story, such as denying entry to citizens of specific countries or demanding new types of documentation. The player may be challenged with moral dilemmas as the game progresses, such as allowing the supposed spouse of an immigrant through despite lacking complete papers at the risk of accepting a terrorist into the country. The game uses a mix of randomly generated entrants and scripted encounters. Randomly generated entrants are created using templates.

Over the course of the game, the player may encounter members of an organization called EZIC, which plots a coup d'état against the Arstotzkan government. The player can also choose to escape to a neighbouring country, Obristan, to start a new life, with or without their family.

The game has a scripted story mode with twenty possible endings depending on the player's actions, as well as some unlockable randomized endless-play modes.

Development 

Papers, Please was developed by Lucas Pope, a former developer for Naughty Dog on the Uncharted series. Pope opted to leave Naughty Dog around 2010, after Uncharted 2: Among Thieves was released, to move to Saitama, Japan, along with his wife Keiko, a game designer herself. Part of this move was to be closer to her family, but Pope also had been developing smaller games along with Keiko during his time at Naughty Dog, and wanted to move away from "the definite formula" of the Uncharted series toward developing more exploratory ideas for his own games. The two worked on a few independent game titles while there, and they briefly relocated to Singapore to help another friend with their game. From his travels in Asia and some return trips to the United States, he became interested in the work of immigration and passport inspectors: "They have a specific thing they’re doing and they’re just doing it over and over again." He recognized the passport checking experience, which he considered "tense", could be made into a fun game.

While he had been able to come up with the mechanics of the passport checking, Pope lacked a story to drive the game. He was then inspired by films like Argo and the Bourne series, which feature characters attempting to infiltrate into or out of other countries with subterfuge. Pope saw the opportunity to reverse those scenarios, putting the player as the role of the immigration officer as to stop these types of agents, matching up with his existing gameplay mechanics. He crafted the fictional nation of Arstotzka, fashioned as a totalitarian, 1982 Eastern Bloc state, with the player guided to uphold the glory of this country by rigorously checking passports and defeating those that might infiltrate it. Arstotzka was partially derived from the setting of Pope's earlier game The Republia Times, where the player acts as editor-in-chief of a newspaper in a totalitarian state and must decide on which stories to include or falsify to uphold the interests of the state. Pope also based aspects of the border crossing for Arstotzka and its neighbors on the Berlin Wall and issues between East and West Germany, stating he was "naturally attracted to Orwellian communist bureaucracy". He made sure to avoid including any specific references to these inspirations, such as avoiding the word "comrade" in both the English and translated versions, as it would directly allude to a Soviet Russia implication. Using a fictional country gave Pope more freedom in the narrative, not having to base events in the game on any real-world politics and avoiding preconceived assumptions.

Work on the game began in November 2012; Pope used his personal financial reserves from his time at Naughty Dog for what he thought would be a few weeks worth of effort to complete and then move onto a more commercially viable title. Pope used the Haxe programming language and the NME framework, both open-source. He was able to build up structures he and his wife developed for Helsing's Fire, an iOS game they developed after moving to Japan, as this provided the means to set how much information about a character could or could not be shown to the player. This also enabled him to include random and semi-random encounters, in which similar events would occur in separate games, but the immigrant's name or details would be different. Much of the game's design was about the purposely-"clunky" user interface elements of checking paperwork, something that Pope was inspired by from his earlier programming experiences from using visual programming languages like HyperCard. Pope found that there was a very careful balance of what rules and randomness could be introduced without overwhelming the player or causing the balance of the game to falter, and cut back on some of the randomness he initially wanted. Pope attempted to keep the narrative non-judgemental about the choices the player made, allowing them to imagine their own take on the events, and further kept elements like the player-character's family status screen shown at the end of each day simple so that it would not affect the player's take on these results.

As Pope developed the game, he regularly posted updates to independent develop forum TIGSource, and got helpful feedback on some of the game's direction. He also created a publicly available demonstration of the game, which further had positive feedback to him. Pope opted to try to have the game submitted to the Steam storefront through the user-voted Greenlight process in April 2013; he was hesitant that the niche nature of the game would put off potential voters and had expected that he would gain more interest from upcoming gaming expositions. However, due to attention drawn by several YouTube streamers that played through the demo, Papers, Please was voted through Greenlight within days.

With new attention to the project, Pope estimated that the game would now take six months to complete, though it ultimately took nine months. One area he expanded on was to create several unique character names for the various citizens that would pass through the game. He opened up to the public to supply names, but ended up with over 30,000 entries, with more than half he considered unusable as they did not figure the types of Eastern European names he wanted or were otherwise "joke names". After the Greenlight process, Pope started to add other features that required the player, as a lowly checkpoint worker, to make significant moral decisions within the game. One such design was the inclusion of the body scanner, where Pope envisioned that the player would recognize this being an invasion of privacy but necessary to detect a suicide bomber. These also helped to drive the game's narrative as to provide rationale for why the player as the passport checker would need to have access to these new tools in response to the larger events in the game's fiction. After being successfully voted on Greenlight, Papers, Please was being touted as an "empathy game", similar to Cart Life (2011), helping Pope to justify his narrative choices. Pope also recognized that not all players would necessarily appreciate the narrative aspects, and started to develop the "endless" mode where players would simply need to process a queue of immigrants limited only by the player making a certain number of mistakes.

Pope released the game on August 8, 2013 for Windows and OS X systems, and for Linux machines on February 12, 2014.

Pope had ported the game to the iPad, and was considering a port to the PlayStation Vita though noted that with the handheld, there are several challenges related to the game's user interface that may have to be revamped. The Vita version was formally announced at the 2014 Gamescom convention in August 2014. With the iOS release, Apple required Pope to censor the full body scanner feature from the game, considering the aspect to be pornographic content. However Apple later commented that the rejection was due to a "misunderstanding" and allowed Pope to resubmit the uncensored game by including a "nudity option". The iPad version was subsequently released on December 12, 2014. The Vita's version was released on December 12, 2017.

By March 2014, Pope stated that he was "kind of sick to death" of Papers, Please, in that he wanted to continue to focus on more smaller games that would only take a few months of time to create and release, and had already spent far too much in his mind on this one. He expected to keep supporting Papers, Please and its ports, but had no plans to expand the game or release downloadable content, but does not rule out revisiting the Arstotzka setting again in a future game.

An updated iOS release and a new Android port were released on August 5, 2022. The iOS version was free for those that already own the iPad version. Both versions were redesigned by developers to make the game playable on smaller screens without having to zoom, for example.

Reception 

Papers, Please received positive reviews on release, receiving "generally favorable reviews" from 40 reviews on Metacritic. Papers, Please has been praised for the sense of immersion provided by the game mechanics, and the intense emotional reaction. CBC News' Jonathan Ore called Papers, Please a "nerve-racking sleuthing game with relentless pacing and dozens of compelling characters – all from a desk job". Simon Parkin writing for The New Yorker blog declared Papers, Please the top video game of 2013. He wrote: "Grim yet affecting, it’s a game that may change your attitude the next time you’re in line at the airport." Some critics received the story very well: Ben "Yahtzee" Croshaw of The Escapists series Zero Punctuation lauded the game for being a truly unique entry for 2013 and even made it one of his top five games for that year; he cited the game's morality as his reasoning by explaining that "[Papers, Please] presents us constant moral choices, but makes it really hard to be a good person... while you could waive the rules to reunite a couple [...] you do it at the expense of your own family... You have to decide if you want to create a better world or just look after you and yours."

Wired listed Papers, Please as their top game for 2013, recognizing that the game's title, often coupled with the Hollywood representation of Nazi officials stopping people and demanding to see their identification, alongside the drab presentation captured the ideas of living as a lowly worker in a police state. In 2019, the game was ranked 45th on The Guardian newspaper's The 50 Best Video Games of the 21st Century list.

Some critics reacted against the paperwork gameplay. Stephanie Bendixsen from the ABC's game review show Good Game found the game "tedious", commenting "while I found the issues that arose from the decisions you are forced to make quite interesting, I was just so bored that I just struggled to go from one day to the next. I was torn between wanting to find out more, and just wanting it all to stop."

Papers, Please is considered by several journalists as an example of video games as an art form. Papers, Please is frequently categorized as an "empathy game", a type of role-playing game that "asks players to inhabit their character's emotional worlds", as described by Patrick Begley of the Sydney Morning Herald, or as described by Pope himself, "other people simulators". Pope noted that he had not set out to make an empathy game, but the emotional ties created by his scenarios came about naturally from developing the core mechanics.

Awards

Papers, Please won the Seumas McNally Grand Prize, "Excellence in Narrative", and "Excellence in Design" awards at the 2014 Independent Games Festival Awards and was nominated for the Nuovo Award. The title also won the "Innovation Award" and "Best Downloadable Game" at the 2014 Game Developers Choice Awards. The game won "Best Simulation Game" and was nominated in the categories of "Best Game", "Game Design", and "Game Innovation" at the 2014 BAFTA Video Games Awards. Papers, Please also won an Interactive Narrative and Game + Play Peabody Award in 2021.

Sales
As of March 2014, at the time of the BAFTA awards, Pope stated that the game had sold 500,000 copies. By August 2016, three years from release, Pope stated that more than 1.8 million copies had been sold across all platforms.

Short film adaptation 
Two Russian filmmakers, Liliya Tkach and Nikita Ordynskiy of Kinodom Productions, developed an 11-minute live-action film based on Papers, Please, entitled Papers, Please: The Short Film, starring Igor Savochkin as the passport inspector. The film was authorized by Lucas Pope after Ordynskiy sent him the screenplay via email. The film premiered at the Trekhgorka House of Culture in Moscow, Russia, on January 27, 2018. The film debuted worldwide via YouTube and the Steam storefront on February 24, 2018. The film received "Overwhelmingly Positive" reviews on Steam upon its release. The short film's success led Tkach and Ordynskiy to pursue a similar short film for Beholder, another game set in a totalitarian state. Ordynskiy would later voice Seaman Aleksei Toporov in Return of the Obra Dinn, a 2018 video game developed by Pope, which was also a Seumas McNally Grand Prize winner.

See also 
 The Republia Times
 The Westport Independent

References

External links 
 

2013 video games
Android (operating system) games
Dystopian video games
Humanitarian video games
Independent Games Festival winners
Immigration in fiction
Indie video games
IOS games
Linux games
MacOS games
PlayStation Vita games
Puzzle video games
Seumas McNally Grand Prize winners
Simulation video games
Steam Greenlight games
Totalitarianism in fiction
Video games adapted into films
Video games developed in Japan
Video games set in 1982
Video games with alternate endings
Video games set in a fictional country
Windows games
BAFTA winners (video games)
Game Developers Choice Award winners
Video games designed by Lucas Pope